Sardina may refer to:

 Alexander-Martin Sardina, German-Italian scientist and former member of parliament
 Sardina pilchardus, the European pilchard in the monotypic genus Sardina
 Case Sardina, a district of the city of Calcinaia in the Province of Pisa (Region of Tuscany), Italy

See also
 Sardinia (disambiguation)
 Sardine (disambiguation)
 Sardinas, a surname